The 2018 Michigan gubernatorial election took place on November 6, 2018, to elect the next governor of Michigan, concurrently with the election of Michigan's Class I U.S. Senate seat, as well as other elections to the United States Senate in other states, elections to the United States House of Representatives, and various state and local elections.

Incumbent Republican Governor Rick Snyder was term-limited and was unable to seek a third term in office. The filing deadline was April 24, 2018. The Republican, Democratic and Libertarian parties chose their nominees in a partisan primary on August 7, 2018. 2018 was the first year the Libertarian Party held a gubernatorial primary alongside the two other major parties in the state of Michigan. The Working Class Party, U.S. Taxpayers Party, Green Party and Natural Law Party chose their nominees at state party conventions.

Democrat Gretchen Whitmer was elected with 53.3% of the vote. The election was not as close as expected, with Whitmer receiving 53.3% of the vote to Schuette's 43.8%. Schuette performed best in more sparsely populated areas, while Whitmer was supported by large margins in large and medium cities, such as Detroit, Ann Arbor, and Lansing. Whitmer also performed well in the Detroit suburbs. She carried former Republican stronghold Kent County (location of Grand Rapids), the first Democratic candidate to do so since James Blanchard's landslide 1986 reelection. Democrats swept the statewide races by also holding onto the Senate seat that was up for re-election, and picking up the positions of secretary of state and attorney general. They also captured every state university trustee seat that was up for election as well as the State Board of Education.

Republican primary

Candidates

Nominated
 Bill Schuette, Attorney General of Michigan

Eliminated in primary
 Brian Calley, Lieutenant Governor
 Patrick Colbeck, state senator
 Jim Hines, physician and president of the Christian Medical and Dental Associations

Declined
 Jase Bolger, former Speaker of the Michigan House of Representatives
 Larry C. Inman, state representative
 David Agema, former Republican National Committeeman and former state representative (endorsed Patrick Colbeck)
 Ruth Johnson, Michigan Secretary of State and nominee for lieutenant governor in 2006 (running for state senate)
 Arlan Meekhof, Majority Leader of the Michigan Senate
 Candice Miller, Macomb County Public Works Commissioner and former U.S. Representative (endorsed Bill Schuette)

Endorsements

Debates

Polling

Results

Democratic primary

Candidates

Nominated
 Gretchen Whitmer, former Ingham County Prosecuting Attorney and former Minority Leader of the Michigan Senate

Eliminated in primary
 Abdul El-Sayed, former executive director of the Detroit Department of Health and Wellness Promotion
 Shri Thanedar, author and entrepreneur

Write-In
 Bill C. Cobbs, businessman

Declined
 John Austin, former president of the Michigan Board of Education
 Geoffrey Fieger, attorney and nominee for governor in 1998
 Mark Hackel, Macomb County Executive
 Bart Stupak, former U.S. Representative
 Mark Bernstein, member of University of Michigan Board of Regents
 Mike Duggan, Mayor of Detroit
 Dan Kildee, U.S. Representative
 Andy Levin, energy consultant and son of Congressman Sander Levin (running for Congress in MI-9)
 Barbara McQuade, former United States Attorney for the Eastern District of Michigan
 Gary Peters, U.S. Senator
 Matt Simoncini, CEO of Lear Corporation

Endorsements

Debates

Polling

Results

Libertarian primary 
The Libertarian Party is one of three parties that have a primary in Michigan.

Candidates

Nominated
 Bill Gelineau

Eliminated in Primary

 John Tatar

Endorsements

Debates

Results

Green Convention 
The Green Party chose candidates for the 2018 ballot at its state convention on May 5, 2018, at the University of Michigan-Flint.

Candidates

Declared & Nominated 
 Jennifer Kurland, president of the Redford Union School Board

U.S. Taxpayers Party

Candidates

Declared & Nominated 

 Todd Schleiger

Natural Law Party

Candidates

Declared & Nominated 

 Keith Butkovich

General election

Predictions

Endorsements

Polling

with Bill Schuette and Abdul El-Sayed

with Bill Schuette and Shri Thanedar

with Brian Calley and Gretchen Whitmer

with Brian Calley and Shri Thanedar

with Bill Schuette and Geoffrey Fieger

with Bill Schuette and Mike Duggan

Fundraising

Debates
Two televised debates between Schuette and Whitmer were scheduled. The first debate was held on Friday, October 12 hosted by Grand Rapids television station WOOD-TV. That debate mainly concentrated on issues and there were no surprises or major errors from either candidate.  The second debate was hosted by Detroit television station WDIV and was held on Wednesday, October 24. The two again clashed on various issues, but Schuette made a gaffe when he mixed up Whitmer's name with that of former governor Jennifer Granholm.

Campaign
While Whitmer's Democratic primary opponents publicly endorsed Whitmer in the general election, Republican nominee Schuette left the party split after the acrimonious battle with lieutenant governor Calley, with outgoing governor Rick Snyder refusing to endorse Schuette. Schuette also tried to hide his endorsement by Donald Trump from the primary in the general election. His actions as attorney general also came back to haunt him.  Whitmer held consistent leads in polls over Schuette over the entire year.

Results

By congressional district
Whitmer won 7 of Michigan's 14 congressional districts. The seven districts she won all elected Democrats to Congress, and the seven that Schuette won all elected Republicans, though he won the district that elected Justin Amash by a very narrow margin of 0.4% and the district that elected Fred Upton by an even thinner 0.2%.

Notes

Partisan clients

References

External links
Candidates at Vote Smart
Candidates at Ballotpedia

Official campaign websites
Bill Gelineau (L) for Governor
Jennifer Kurland (G) for Governor
Bill Schuette (R) for Governor
Gretchen Whitmer (D) for Governor
Todd Schleiger (UST) for Governor

Gubernatorial
2018
2018 United States gubernatorial elections
Gretchen Whitmer